Modern College of Management and Information Technology (MCMIT) or Modern College is a private college located in Korba, Chhattisgarh, India. Established in 2006 under the aegis of the Bilquis Education Society. It is affiliated to Atal Bihari Vajpayee Vishwavidyalaya, Bilaspur

Infrastructure
Modern College is located at three storied building located in Heart of the Korba city. Institute has a well equipped Computer Lab with high-speed internet connection, Library and fully Air-conditioned classrooms equipped with E-learning facility.

Events

Annual Function of Modern College celebrated in the month of December every year is termed as Sanskaar.

References

External links
 

Universities and colleges in Chhattisgarh
Colleges affiliated to Atal Bihari Vajpayee Vishwavidyalaya
Korba, Chhattisgarh
Educational institutions established in 2006
2006 establishments in Chhattisgarh